Hanson Hill is a snow-covered hill,  high, with two lower summits, one to the north and one to the south, standing  southeast of Cape Roquemaurel and  west-northwest of Zanoge Hill on Trinity Peninsula in Graham Land, Antarctica. This hill was roughly charted but left unnamed by the French expedition under Captain Jules Dumont d'Urville in March 1838. In 1948, the UK Antarctic Place-Names Committee (UK-APC) gave the name "Thanaron Hill" to the feature. Their action followed a 1946 search by the Falkland Islands Dependencies Survey (FIDS) which failed to identify a coastal point in the vicinity to which d'Urville had given the name "Cap Thanaron." The latter feature (now Thanaron Point) was subsequently identified. In 1963, the UK-APC renamed the hill described after Thomas A. Hanson, a FIDS surveyor at Hope Bay, 1957–59.

Map
 Trinity Peninsula. Scale 1:250000 topographic map No. 5697. Institut für Angewandte Geodäsie and British Antarctic Survey, 1996.

References

 SCAR Composite Antarctic Gazetteer.

Hills of Trinity Peninsula